Union Township is one of twelve townships in Boone County, Indiana. As of the 2010 census, its population was 2,357 and it contained 864 housing units.

History
The Simpson-Breedlove House was listed on the National Register of Historic Places in 2016.

Geography

Unincorporated towns
 Big Springs
 Gadsden
 Northfield
 Rosston

Adjacent townships
 Center (west)
 Eagle (south)
 Marion (north)
 Worth (southwest)
 Clay Township, Hamilton County (southeast)
 Washington Township, Hamilton County (east)

Major highways
  U.S. Route 421
  Indiana State Road 32

References
 United States Census Bureau cartographic boundary files
 U.S. Board on Geographic Names

External links
 Indiana Township Association
 United Township Association of Indiana

Townships in Boone County, Indiana
Townships in Indiana